Vegard Arnhoff (born 7 October 1977) is a Norwegian sailor. He was born in Oslo, and represented the Soon Yacht Club. He competed at the 2000 Summer Olympics in Sydney, where he placed 13th in the 49er class, together with Christoffer Sundby.

References

External links

Norwegian male sailors (sport)
1977 births
Living people
Sportspeople from Oslo
Sailors at the 2000 Summer Olympics – 49er
Olympic sailors of Norway